The Portland Webfoots were a Minor League Baseball team in the Pacific Northwest League. They played at Vaughn Street Ballpark.

When the Pacific Northwest League and the California League merged to create the Pacific Coast League in  the Webfoots disbanded and the Portland Browns were created.

History 
In the Webfoots first year of competition, it was reported that they had trouble keeping attendance up at their home field. This began a debate over whether or not Portland should hold a team in the  league expansion with the California League into the Pacific Coast League, something that the Webfoots President Jack Marshal opposed. Some newspapers claimed that Marshal's opposition was due in large part to his personal dislike of Pacific Northwest League President William Henry Lucas.

This led to a long debate over the inclusion of the Portland team in the Pacific Coast League. Both the Portland and Seattle clubs first wanted to create a rival league to the Pacific Coast League. The Portland team was accepted into the Pacific Coast League but not before a lawsuit filed by the Portland team against the Pacific Northwest League that said the league harassed the Portland team into throwing the league pennant to the Butte, Montana baseball team.

Year-by-year record

Notable players
George Stovall
Deacon Van Buren
Martin Glendon
Joe Tinker

See also
History of baseball in Portland, Oregon
Portland Webfeet
Portland Beavers

References

Defunct minor league baseball teams
Professional baseball teams in Oregon
Defunct baseball teams in Oregon
1901 establishments in Oregon
1902 disestablishments in Oregon
Webfoots
Baseball in Portland, Oregon
Baseball teams disestablished in 1902
Baseball teams established in 1901